Engystomops montubio is a species of frog in the family Leptodactylidae. It is endemic to western Ecuador. It inhabits lowland evergreen and semi-deciduous forest and lowland dry shrub. It also inhabits open man-made habitats, such as pastures, near buildings, etc. Breeding takes place in pools during the rainy season.

References

montubio
Amphibians of Ecuador
Endemic fauna of Ecuador
Taxonomy articles created by Polbot
Amphibians described in 2004